The 1946 California Golden Bears football team was an American football team that represented the University of California in the Pacific Coast Conference (PCC) during the 1946 college football season. In their first year under head coach Frank Wickhorst, the Bears compiled a 2–7 record (1–6 against PCC opponents) and were outscored by a total of 169 to 112.

Schedule

After the season

The 1947 NFL Draft was held on December 16, 1946. The following Golden Bears were selected.

References

California
California Golden Bears football seasons
California Golden Bears football